Natalya Gennadyevna Morskova, née Kirtchik (born January 17, 1966, in Rostov-on-Don) is a Russian former handball player who competed for the Soviet Union in the 1988 Summer Olympics and for the Unified Team in the 1992 Summer Olympics.

In 1988 she won the bronze medal with the Soviet team. She played all five matches and scored 25 goals.

Four years later she was a member of the Unified Team which won the bronze medal. She played all five matches and scored 41 goals.

She later represented Spain in international championships.

External links
 

1966 births
Living people
Soviet female handball players
Russian female handball players
Spanish female handball players
Olympic handball players of the Soviet Union
Olympic handball players of the Unified Team
Handball players at the 1988 Summer Olympics
Handball players at the 1992 Summer Olympics
Olympic bronze medalists for the Soviet Union
Olympic bronze medalists for the Unified Team
Olympic medalists in handball
Sportspeople from Rostov-on-Don
Medalists at the 1992 Summer Olympics
Medalists at the 1988 Summer Olympics
Expatriate handball players
Russian expatriate sportspeople in Spain